A firewoman is a female firefighter.

Firewoman or Firewomen may also refer to:

 Women in firefighting
 West Michigan Firewomen, women's soccer team
 "Fire Woman", 1989 song by The Cult
 Firewoman (Exhuma Exhortation), 1996 song from the album Trip/Reset

See also
 Woman of Fire, 1971 Korean film
 Woman of Fire '82, 1982 Korean film
 A Woman on Fire, 1969 Italian film
 Fireman (disambiguation)
 Firefighter (disambiguation)
 Fire Fighters (disambiguation)